Igdalu may refer to:
 Igdalu, Armenia
 Igdalu, Iran (disambiguation)